Amur-Nyzhnodniprovskyi District (sometimes abbreviated as "AND") is an urban district of the city of Dnipro, in southern Ukraine. It is located on the city's north and on the left-bank of Dnieper River along with the city's Industrialnyi and Samarskyi districts. 

Its name is derived from a small settlement of Amur and the Nyzhnodniprovsk railway station. The first village located on what is now the Amur-Nyzhnodniprovskyi District was founded in the late 16th century, making the area one of the oldest inhabited parts of Dnipro.

History 
According to historical findings on the current territory of the Amur-Nyzhnodniprovskyi District there was a village called Kamianka that was founded in 1596. Kamianka is considered to be one of the oldest settlements in Left-bank Ukraine. In 1757 the village Berezanivka was founded by the Zaporozhian Cossack Berezan. The territory contained the settlement of Manuylivka (the Ukrainian SSR changed the name to Vorontsovka in 1922) which was named after the Cossack settler Manuil. 

Until 1786 all three villages belonged to belonged to the Samara province (palanka) of Zaporizhian Sich.  After the liquidation of Zaporizhian Sich by the Russian government of Catherine the Great in 1775, the region was admitted into the newly formed Novomoskovsk county of Yekaterinoslav Governorate. The territory on the left bank of Dnieper across Yekaterinoslav at interfluvial region between Dnieper and Samara was known locally as Zadniprovia (Trans-Dnieper region).

The village of Amur emerged in 1875 and contained various factories. To the east of Amur there was a village Baraf which was merged with Amur to form an industrial small city named Amur-Nyzhnodniprovskyi (Nyzhnodniprovskyi meaning "Lower Dnieper"). After a railway was laid in the area in 1895/1897 the area became heavy industrial. In September 1917 all settlements of Zadniprovia were organized into a district of Zadniprovskyi Raion. On 25 January 1918 the district was renamed into Amur-Nyzhnodniprovsk.

In World War II the area saw heavy fighting during the June 1941 phase of Operation Barbarossa.

In 1969 the district was split in half and at its eastern and northern portions was created the Industrialnyi District. From the late 1970s until the mid 1980s the district was greatly expanded.

Neighborhoods
 Amur
 Nyzhnodniprovsk
 Manuilivka
 Sakhalin
 Sultanivka
 Sonyachny
 Kalynovsky
 Borzhom
 Kamianka
 Lomivka
 Livoberezhny
 Berezanivka

Gallery

References

External links 

 

Urban districts of Dnipro
1596 establishments in Ukraine
1918 establishments in Ukraine